Cadillac Area Public School district (CAPS) is a school district in Michigan. The district encompasses one senior high school, one alternative education high school, one junior high school, one middle school and three elementary schools.

Schools

Senior high school (9-12) 

 Cadillac High School

 Cadillac Innovation High School

Middle school (6-8) 

 Mackinaw Trail Middle School

Elementary schools (K-5) 

 Forest View Elementary
 Franklin Elementary
 Lincoln Elementary

Former elementary school 

 Cooley Elementary (closed 2012)
Kenwood Elementary (closed 2020)
 McKinley Elementary (closed 2012)

External links
 Cadillac Area Public School district site

School districts in Michigan
Education in Wexford County, Michigan